Larry Strickland (September 3, 1931 – August 29, 1979) was an American Football center for six seasons between 1954 and 1959 for the Chicago Bears, a one-time Pro Bowler and one-time first-team All-Pro.

Strickland was born in Tyler, Texas. He was drafted by the Chicago Bears in the 13th round (150th overall) of the 1953 NFL Draft. He was survived by his wife Betty Strickland, and he had no children.

References
Pro-Football-reference.com

1931 births
1979 deaths
Sportspeople from Tyler, Texas
American football centers
North Texas Mean Green football players
Chicago Bears players
Western Conference Pro Bowl players
Players of American football from Texas